Heliocheilus confertissima is a species of moth of the family Noctuidae. It is found from Northern Africa to the Middle East, including Saudi Arabia, Iran and Oman.

References

External links 
 Provisional Checklist of the Macro-heterocera[Lepidoptera] of the UAE

Heliocheilus
Moths of Africa
Moths of the Middle East
Moths described in 1865